Stephen D. Sugarman was the Roger J. Traynor Professor of Law at the UC Berkeley School of Law, where he has taught since 1972. He was the associate dean of the UC Berkeley School of Law from 1980 to 1982, and then again from 2004 to 2009. At UC Berkeley, he taught multiple classes in the social justice curriculum, including classes torts and sports law. He had been a visiting professor at the London School of Economics, at University College, London, and at Columbia University, among other institutions. Sugarman passed away on December 26, 2021 at age 79 after a four-year battle with kidney cancer.

Work
With his colleague John Coons, Sugarman was an influential architect of the school voucher movement in the United States, and their research was cited by the Heritage Foundation to argue for such programs in 1981. Coons and Sugarman also argued the case Serrano v. Priest before the California Supreme Court in 1976.

References

External links
Faculty page

Northwestern University alumni
Living people
American legal scholars
UC Berkeley School of Law faculty
Year of birth missing (living people)